Mahinda IV was King of Anuradhapura in the 10th century, whose reign lasted from 975 to 991. He succeeded his brother Sena IV as King of Anuradhapura and was succeeded by his son Sena V.

During his reign, he fought a war in the Pandyan Country, and defeated multiple Chola generals of Parantaka Chola II.

See also
 List of Sri Lankan monarchs
 History of Sri Lanka

References

External links
 Kings & Rulers of Sri Lanka
 Codrington's Short History of Ceylon

Monarchs of Anuradhapura
M
M
M